Sweet Soul Music is the second studio album by New Zealand musical recording artist Aaradhna, released in 2008 on Valentine's Day.

Track listing
"Didn't I (Blow Your Mind This Time)"
"I Want You Back"
"Betcha by Golly Wow"
"You Are the Sunshine of My Life"
"I Wish It Would Rain"
"Bring It On Home to Me"
"Ain't Nothing Like the Real Thing" (featuring Adeaze)
"Let's Get It On"
"Let's Stay Together"
"Natural Woman"
"Ain't Too Proud to Beg"
"Heatwave"
"Just My Imagination (Running Away with Me)"
"Warrior"

Charts

References 

2008 albums
Covers albums
Aaradhna albums